Mark Robichaud (born  1964) is a former American football coach. He most recently was the head coach at UMass Dartmouth before retiring after the 2022 season. He previously was the defensive coordinator for Shepherd where he helped lead the team to a record of 54–31 in that time span.

During his time at Shepherd the team had eight winning seasons, five WVIAC championships, three Division II Playoff appearances, and two advances into the second round.

At UMass Dartmouth, he has led the team back to success reaching the New England Bowl in 2021, and their first Division III Playoff appearance in twenty years in 2022. He finished second all-time in wins with the team.

Coaching career

Early years
Robichaud began his coaching career with Springfield and Milford Academy. He then joined Wesleyan as a linebackers coach.

He got his first main coaching job as a defensive coordinator for Chicago. In 1991, his final year with the team, they finished 0–10 under Greg Quick.

Shepherd
In 1992, Shepherd hired Robichaud as the team's defensive line coach, recruiting coordinator, and athletic-academic advisor. In his nine year stretch with the team, the team went 54–31, including eight winning seasons, five West Virginia Intercollegiate Athletic Conference (WVIAC) championships, and three NCAA Division II tournament appearances, including two advancements to the second round.

Brown
During Robichaud's stint with Shepherd he worked with Division I team Brown where he worked as an assistant coach during the 2000 season.

Bishop Stang High School
In 2004, Robichaud joined Bishop Stang High School as an assistant coach. With the school, they won two Eastern Athletic Conference championships, two Massachusetts Interscholastic Athletic Association (MIAA) playoff berths, and an appearance in the 2005 MIAA Superbowl.

UMass Dartmouth

In 2007, Robichaud was hired by UMass Dartmouth to be their third head coach all-time, despite having no prior head coaching experience. He replaced Bill Kavanaugh who resigned to become the head coach of Robichaud's previous team, Bishop Stang High School. In his first season with the team they went 5–5. The team started 0–5, but after beating Nichols, 28–7, the team won five straight to finish at an even .500. Over the next ten years the team was consistently below average, reaching as high 6–4 in 2008 and as low as 0–10 in 2009 and 1–9 in 2012.

In 2019, the Corsairs began the season with a 54–7 win over Alfred State and won their first four games of the season before falling to Framingham State 39–33. The team would drop another game to Bridgewater State 56–20 before winning their homecoming game against Worcester State 46–8. The team finished with a record of 7–3, their best since their last Bowl Game appearance in 2004 under Kavanaugh. In 2020, the season was cancelled due to the COVID-19 pandemic.

In 2021, Robichaud and the Corsairs were back to their winning ways after a year off after the cancellation of the 2020 season. Compiling a record of 9–2 enroot to a New England Bowl appearance where the team faced Alfred State. The game ended in a 42–16 win for the Corsairs, their first bowl win since 2003.

In 2022, Robichaud and the Corsairs compiled a 9–1 record en route to a playoff appearance and a MASCAC championship after beating Plymouth State 46–21 in Plymouth. He was also given the Murray Lewis Award, given to an outstanding football coach who positively influenced the game of football. Robichaud was named as the BSN Coach of the Year.

Retirement
On February 1, 2023, Robichaud announced his retirement from coaching.

Personal life
Robichaud and his wife live in Little Compton, Rhode Island where they have two children. He previously served as a physical education teacher for Wesleyan University and Westport Middle School.

Head coaching record

College

References

External links
 UMass Dartmouth Corsairs bio

1954 births
Living people
UMass Dartmouth Corsairs football coaches
Chicago Maroons football coaches
Wesleyan Cardinals football coaches
Shepherd Rams football coaches
Springfield Pride football coaches
Springfield Pride football players
Brown Bears football coaches